Hrdlív is a municipality and village in Kladno District in the Central Bohemian Region of the Czech Republic. It has about 500 inhabitants.

Etymology
The name is derived from the personal name Hrdlej or Hrlej.

Geography
It lies in the Prague Plateau.

History

The first written mention of Hrdlív is from 1316. From the 15th century, Hrdlív was part of the Smečno estate, which belonged to the Martinic family (since 1792 Clam-Martinic). After the abolition of feudalism in 1848, Hrdlív became part of Třebichovice municipality. In 1906, it became a separate municipality.

Sights
The most notable building is a small Baroque chapel dating from 1745.

References

External links

 

Villages in Kladno District